Potential Plus UK, officially the National Association for Gifted Children (NAGC), is a national association based in  Milton Keynes in the United Kingdom, that offers support for high learning potential (gifted and talented) children, their parents and schools. It is a registered charity under English law.

The organisation aims to support the social, emotional and learning needs of children with high learning potential.  This includes children who have been identified as gifted and talented; children who have the potential to achieve through a wide range of abilities in academic subjects, sport, the arts and leadership; those who are dual or multiple exceptional (giftedness coupled with a disability or learning difficulty, also known as twice exceptional or 2e) and the profoundly gifted. 

There is an organisation of the same name and acronym (NAGC) in the United States, with a similar remit and scope.

References

External links
 Official website (United Kingdom) 
 Official website (United States)

Education in Milton Keynes
Educational charities based in the United Kingdom
Educational organisations based in the United Kingdom
Gifted education
Giftedness
Organisations based in Milton Keynes
Organizations established in 1967